Angola High School is a public high school named for the town it serves in Angola, Steuben County, Indiana. Angola High School is in the lake region of northeast Indiana and serves students from rural and small town areas. Five percent of the student body population are minorities. Twenty-three percent of students receive free or reduced lunches.

Angola High School is a part of the Metropolitan School District of Steuben County.

About

Student opportunities
Programs include work studies, internships, and classes at Trine University’s Middle College.

Honors and awards
 Indiana Four Star School - 2000,2001
 Indiana "Best Buy" School - 2000
 New American High School - 1999
 National School-to-Work Site - 1999
 Indiana Blue Ribbon High School - 1997,1998,1999

Demographics

2013 Academic indicators
 National Rank:          2,267
 State Rank:                46
 College Readiness Index: 15.0
 Algebra Proficiency:      3.0
 English Proficiency:      2.8
 Student:Teacher Ration:  20:1
 Medal Awarded:         Silver
 AP Participation:         29%

Activities

Athletics
Angola High School is part of the Northeastern Corner Conference for all of its athletic teams.

 Cross Country (girls)
 Cross Country (boys)
 Football
 Golf
 Soccer (boys)
 Soccer (girls)
 Basketball (boys)
 Basketball (girls)
 Cheerleading
 Swimming
 Wrestling
 Baseball
 Gymnastics (girls)
 Outdoor Track & Field
 Softball
 Tennis (boys)
 Tennis (girls)
 Volleyball (girls)

Notable alumni

 , former head Angola High school football coach in the mid 1960s.

See also
 List of high schools in Indiana

References

External links
 
 Angola High School report from US News & World Report

Education in Steuben County, Indiana
Buildings and structures in Steuben County, Indiana
Public high schools in Indiana